Ravex (stylized as ravex; a portmanteau of rave and Avex) is a Japanese electronic music group, consisting of Shinichi Osawa, Tomoyuki Tanaka and record producer DJ Taku Takahashi. Established to mark the 20th anniversary of the Avex label, their productions are usually based on collaborations with other artists on the label. Tezuka Productions are providing art, animation and the use of Osamu Tezuka characters to the project.

Their debut album, Trax, was released on April 29, 2009. The deluxe edition contains a DVD featuring the group's music videos as well as a new 18-minute short featuring Astro Boy and other Osamu Tezuka characters.

Discography

Singles
"I Rave U feat. DJ Ozma" – December 17, 2008
"Believe in Love feat. BoA" – February 18, 2009

Albums
Trax (2009)

References

External links

Japanese electronic music groups
Japanese electropop groups
2008 establishments in Japan
Musical groups established in 2008
Musical groups from Tokyo